"Älä herätä mua unesta" is the third single by Finnish rapper Mikael Gabriel, which was released on 1 January 2014 by Universal Music Oy. The song has peaked at number 2 on the Finnish singles chart.

Track listing

Music video
Music video was uploaded on 19 November 2016 by Mikael Gabriel.

Charts

Release history

References 

2014 singles
2014 songs
Universal Music Group singles
Song articles with missing songwriters